Kabu 16 Hydroelectric Power Station is a  hydroelectric power station under construction in Burundi. It is under development by the government of Burundi, with funding from the Exim Bank of India. Construction began in March 2019.

Location
The power station is located across Kaburantwa River, a tributary of the Rusizi River.

Overview
The engineering, procurement, and construction (EPC) contract was awarded to Angelique International Limited of India.
WAPCOS Ltd. (A Govt. of India Undertaking) is Project Management Consultant for Kabu-16 HEP and has been monitoring the project for good quality and timely completion.
Two vertical Francis turbines, each rated at 10 megawatts will be supplied by Voith, the German industrial machinery manufacturer. Other infrastructure to be installed, includes the construction of staff housing for the construction workers, an electric switchyard, electricity transmission lines and access roads to the site.

Funding
The power station is funded by the Government of India, with money borrowed from the Export-Import Bank of India.

Operations and benefits
Upon completion, it is expected that the power station will be operated by Rugadiso, the Burundian state-owned electric utility monopoly company, responsible for generation, transmission and distribution.

The power station will supply 177.7GWh of green energy into the Burundi grid, increasing available power for national economic expansion and job creation.

See also

List of power stations in Burundi

References

External links
 Approximate Location of Kabu 16 Hydroelectric Power Station
 Voith supplies water to wire solution for small hydropower plant in Burundi As of 18 June 2019.

Power stations in Burundi
Cibitoke Province
Hydroelectric power stations in Burundi
Dams under construction
Buildings and structures in Burundi